Linville may refer to:

Places
 Linville, Queensland, a town in the Somerset Region, Australia
 Linville, North Carolina, United States
 Linville Falls, North Carolina, United States

Outdoor attractions in the United States 
 Linville Caverns, North Carolina
 Linville Falls, North Carolina
 Linville Gorge Wilderness, North Carolina
 Lake Linville, Kentucky
 Linville River, North Carolina

People
 Joanne Linville, (1928–2021), American film and television actress 
 Kelli Linville, (born 1948), American politician
 Larry Linville, (1939–2000), American actor
 Matthew Linville, American actor; see List of 7th Heaven characters

See also
Linnville (disambiguation)